Białystok is, and has been for centuries, the main hub of transportation for the Podlaskie Voivodeship and the entire northeastern section of Poland. It is a major city on the European Union roadways (Via Baltica) and railways (Rail Baltica) to the Baltic Republics and Finland. It is also a main gateway of trade with Belarus due to its proximity to the border and its current and longstanding relationship with Hrodno, Belarus. Passenger trains do connect from Suvalki, Hrodno and Lithuania to Warsaw and the rest of the European passenger network. An extensive public transportation system is provided within the city by three bus services, but no tram or subway exists.

A civil airport, Białystok-Krywlany Airport, lies within the city limits, but does not provide regularly scheduled service. There are plans to build a new regional airport, Białystok-Saniki Airport, in the next few years that will provide flights within Europe.

Railways

Passenger services is provided by two rail service providers:
PKP Intercity - Tanie Linie Kolejowe (TLK) - cheap express trains with optional reservation in the first class, no reservation in second class; some night TLK trains provide couchette and sleeper cars; sleeper cars and couchettes must be reserved. Most of the TLK trains have first and second class cars, but some (especially on shorter routes) are second-class only.

Przewozy Regionalne - runs only regional passenger trains financed by the voivodeship. Passenger trains are mostly run using older electric multiple units (usually ED72, EN71 and EN57) on electrified lines or rail buses on non-electrified lines. InterRegio (IR)
low-cost inter-regional fast train, second class only, stops at medium and major stations only

Przewozy Regionalne provides service on the following routes:
Białystok - Sokółka - Augustów - Suwałki
Białystok - Sokółka - Kuźnica Białystok- Hrodno, Belarus
Białystok - Warsaw
Białystok - Mońki - Grajewo - Ełk 	
Hajnówka - Czeremcha - Siemiatycze - Siedlce 	
Białystok - Bielsk Podlaski - Czeremcha (Connects to Hajnówka - Siedlce service)

There are 13 trains a day from Warsaw, the first one leaving at 4.55 and the last one at 21.30. The journey takes about 2 hours and 30 minutes. 11 of those trains are operated by PKP Intercity and cost zl 39 (10 euro) for the second class and zl 59 (15 euro) for the first-class ticket. There are two second-class only trains operated by Przewozy Regionalne (PR) which cost zl 29 (7 euro). These leave Warsaw at 11.40 and 20.05. Białystok has also direct connections with other cities in northern Poland such as Gdańsk and Olsztyn.

For timetables and prices, see Polish State Railways.

Rail Baltica

Rail Baltica is one of the priority projects of the European Union Trans-European Transport Networks (TEN-T). The project is supposed to link Finland, Baltic States and Poland and also improve the connection between central and eastern Europe and Germany.

Roads and highways

The National Roads running through Podlaskie:
  – Połowce (Belarus-Polish border)-Bielsk Podlaski-Białystok-Kuźnica (Belarus-Polish border)
  – Gołdap (Russia-Polish border)-Ełk-Białystok-Bobrowniki (Belarus-Polish border)
  – Budziska (Polish-Lithuania border)-Białystok-Warsaw-Wrocław-Kudowa Zdrój (Czech-Polish border)
  - Dolna Grupa - Ełk - Augustów - Pomorze - Poćkuny - Ogrodniki - Border crossing
  - Warszawa - Ostrołęka - Łomża - Grajewo - Augustów

Public transport
Bialystok is the largest city in Poland that has only one form of public transit (bus).
There is an extensive bus network that covers the entire city. Tickets have to bought in advance - they are sold in many places, including newsagents, convenience stores, supermarkets and designated ticket retail points. Only in the latter can you buy daily and monthly bus passes. There are 29 city lines, 13 metropolitan lines and 6 night lines (weekends only) served by 3 bus operators partially owned by the municipality - KPKM, KPK and KZK. Each share approximately a third of the lines and the bus fleet.

Intercity bus
PKS operates coaches to most major cities in Poland. Although the coach journey takes much longer than the train and the price is usually more expensive, sometimes the timetables may be more convenient.

PKS:
 PKS w Białymstoku S.A. – Białystok,
 PKS Connex Bielsk Podlaski Sp. z o.o – Bielsk Podlaski,
 PKS w Siemiatyczach Sp. z o.o. – Siemiatycze,
 PKS w Suwałkach S.A. - Suwałki

PPKS:
 PPKS Białystok - Białystok,
 PPKS Łomża – Łomża,
 PPKS Siemiatycze - Siemiatycze,

Air transport
Currently the nearest airport to Białystok is a regional airport, Hrodna Airport in Hrodna, Belarus. Hrodna only provides domestic service within Belarus. The closest international airport to Białystok is Warsaw Frederic Chopin Airport in Warsaw

Białystok-Krywlany Airport lies within city limits. It is currently used only by Aeroklub Białostocki, a sports and recreational flying association, and by private airplanes.

In the first year of operation (2015), according to estimates of the Podlaskie Voidvodeship Marshal's Office, the airport will handle 12,000 passengers growing in 2020 to 145,000 passengers. The airport is proposed to have a runway length of 2,000 m and width of 60 m (45 m + band). It is projected to operate aircraft with a wingspan of up to 52 meters. Construction of the airport is projected to cost five hundred million zloty paid for by a combination of funding from the Podlaskie Voivodeship, the Polish Government and EU infrastructure funding.

References